Grigoris Varfis (2 January 1927, Athens – 10 September 2017, Athens) was a Greek politician.

For the second half of 1983 Varfis was President of the Council of the European Union.

Later, he was a Member of the European Parliament (MEP) from 24 July 1984 to 5 January 1985, where he represented the interests of the Socialist Party (PASOK). Finally, he was until 1989 EU Commissioner for relations with the EU Parliament for Regional Policies (1985) and for Consumer Protection (1986 to 1989) in the first Commission of Jacques Delors. He died on 10 September 2017 at the age of 90.

References

External links 
 

|-

1927 births
2017 deaths
Politicians from Athens
PASOK politicians
MEPs for Greece 1984–1989
Greek European Commissioners
PASOK MEPs
European Commissioners 1985–1988